William Ward (September 2, 1827 in Leicester, England – January 13, 1893 in Utah) was an architect, artist, and builder. Born in England, he converted to Mormonism and emigrated to Utah in 1850. While there, he carved Utah's block of limestone for the Washington Monument. In 1856, he moved to St. Louis, Missouri, and continued to live in the Midwest until returning to Utah in 1888. He died of lung fever in 1893, shortly after his wife succumbed to pneumonia.

A couple of his works are listed on the U.S. National Register of Historic Places.

Works

Gallery

References

1827 births
Converts to Mormonism
English emigrants to the United States
1893 deaths
Architects of Latter Day Saint religious buildings and structures
Architects from Utah
People from Leicester
19th-century American architects